{{DISPLAYTITLE:Rho2 Arae}}

Rho2 Arae is the Bayer designation for a star in the southern constellation of Ara. It received this designation when the star was catalogued by Bode in his Uranographia. This is a rather dim naked-eye star with an apparent visual magnitude of 5.54. Based upon an annual parallax shift of just 6.28 mas, it is around  distant from the Sun, give or take a 30-light-year margin of error.

The spectrum of this star matches a stellar classification of B9 IV or B9 V. The IV luminosity class would indicate the star is in the subgiant stage, while a V class means it is a main-sequence star like the Sun. In the latter case, it is close to entering the subgiant stage at an estimated 93% of the way through its lifespan on the main sequence.

Rho2 Arae has more than three times the mass of the Sun and shines with 238 times the Sun's luminosity. It is spinning rapidly with a projected rotational velocity of 302 km/s.

References

Ara (constellation)
152824
6289
Arae, Rho2
083057
Arae, 24
B-type subgiants
B-type main-sequence stars
Durchmusterung objects